The Småland Artillery Regiment, designation A 6, was a Swedish Army artillery regiment raised in 1895. It was disbanded in 1985. The regiment was based in Jönköping.

Locations and training areas

Barracks
On 1 October 1895, the regiment was officially formed and relocated to Gothenburg. However, an orderly room had already been organized on 25 April 1894 in Stockholm, which was then located at Svea Artillery Regiment's barracks on Valhallavägen. In Gothenburg, the regiment was stationed in the First Göta Artillery Regiment's former barracks at Kaserntorget 11 in Otterhällan (after 1904 known as Kungshöjd). On 6 April 1898, the regiment officially moved into the newly built barracks area on Kompanigatan 6 in Jönköping. However, the move to Jönköping had been going on since 4 February 1898. During 1905, certain extensions were made, and in 1942, two new barracks were built. In 1928, the regiment also took over the training area that had been managed and belonged to Jönköping Regiment.

After the regiment was disbanded, Jönköping Municipality bought 365 hectares out of a total of 370 hectares for SEK 12 million. Commercial City Center AB then bought 25 hectares of the land, the part with, among other things, the barracks buildings. In April 1987, the regimental area was transformed into the A6 Center, which consists of a shopping center and office space in the former barracks.

Training areas
The regiment had its training area from 1896 on Tånga Hed and from 6 June 1898 in Skillingaryd training area. The regiment also had exercise activities at Kronheden and Barnarp in Jönköping during the years 1940–1945. On 1 July 1985, the management of Skillingaryd training area was transferred to Småland Regiment (I 12/Fo 17).

Heraldry and traditions

Coat of arms
The coat of arms of Småland Artillery Regiment (A 6) from 1977 to 1985. Blazon: "Or, the provincial badge of Småland, a double-tailed lion rampant gules, armed and langued azure, in the forepaws a crossbow gules, arrowhead argent, bow and string sable. The shield surmounted two gunbarrels of older pattern in saltire or. The gunbarrels may be sable."

Colours, standards and guidons
A standard was presented to the regiment by His Majesty the King Gustaf V on his birthday on 16 June 1938. The heritage of the regiment was passed on by Northern Småland Regiment (I 12) after the disbandment. From 1 July 2000, the traditions of the Småland Artillery Regiment are kept by the Artillery Regiment (A 9).

Commanding officers
Commanding officers from 1895 to 1985.

 1895–1898: Gottschalk Geijer
 1898–1899: A I R de Laval
 1899–1902: Otto Virgin
 1902–1902: C V G Grönvall (acting)
 1902–1908: Axel Olof Staël von Holstein
 1908–1915: David Hedengren
 1915–1922: Ludvig Hammarskiöld
 1922–1927: Bo Tarras-Wahlberg
 1928–1931: Georg Sylvan
 1931–1932: Per Sylvan
 1932–1937: Hjalmar Thorén
 1937–1942: Johan Gustaf Henning Schmiterlöw
 1942–1949: Raoul Årmann
 1949–1949: Curt Kempff (acting)
 1949–1951: Hilding Kring
 1951–1957: Ivan Thorson
 1957–1957: Nils-Ivar Carlborg (acting)
 1957–1964: Walter Lundqvist
 1964–1970: Sten-Olle Tegmo
 1970–1973: Claes Carlsten
 1973–1976: Gösta Gärdin
 1976–1976: Åke Hessler (acting)
 1976–1980: Sten Geijer
 1980–1982: Fredrik Lilliecreutz
 1982–1985: Lars Carlson

Names, designations and locations

See also
List of Swedish artillery regiments

References

Footnotes

Citations

Sources

Further reading

1894 establishments in Sweden
1985 disestablishments in Sweden
Artillery regiments of the Swedish Army
Disbanded units and formations of Sweden
Jönköping
Military units and formations disestablished in 1985
Military units and formations established in 1894